Buddhamitra may refer to:
Buddhamitra (born circa 60) was a Buddhist nun from India.
Buddhamitra (Zen Patriarch), the ninth Indian Patriarch of Zen Buddhism